The 2014 Lory Meagher Cup was the sixth staging of the Lory Meagher Cup hurling championship since its establishment by the Gaelic Athletic Association in 2009. The cup competition began on 3 May 2014 and ended on 7 June 2014.

Warwickshire were the defending champions, however, they finished third in the group stage. Longford won the title after defeating Fermanagh by 3-18 to 3-16 in the final. The also were promoted to the 2015 Nicky Rackard Cup by defeating Sligo in the relegation-promotion play off.

Table

Round 1

Matches

Round 2

Matches

Round 3

Matches

Final

Statistics

Top scorers

Overall

Single game

External links
 GAA fixtures 2014

References

Lory Meagher Cup
Lory Meagher Cup